Mount Deception is a peak in the Olympic Mountains of Cascadia. It is in Olympic National Park on the Olympic Peninsula in the U.S. state of Washington.

Description 

It is the highest peak of the eastern Olympics.

Mount Deception is located in the northeast portion of the Olympics Mountains just northeast of Mount Mystery between Deception Creek and Royal Creek. The region is known as Royal Basin and includes the upper reaches of Royal Creek. Mount Deception lies at the head of Royal Basin. This location puts it in the rain shadow of the Olympics, resulting in far less precipitation than Mount Olympus and the western Olympics receive. Although Mount Deception is the highest peak in the eastern Olympics, it is not visible from Seattle.

Radiating northward from the shoulders of Mount Deception are Gilhooley Tower, The Needles, Mount Clark, Mount Walkinshaw, and the northeasterly running spur known as Gray Wolf Ridge. To the east and south are Mount Fricaba, Hal Foss Peak, Mount Mystery, and Little Mystery. Two small glaciers hug the mountain's north-facing basalt slopes.

Mount Deception sits on the boundary between the drainage basins of the Dungeness River, to the north, and the Dosewallips River, to the south and east. Deception Creek, a tributary of the Dosewallips River, drains the southern slope of Mount Deception. The pass connects the Dungeness and Dosewallips drainage basins.

History 
Mount Deception had been given the name Mount Holmes by the Seattle Press Expedition in honor of John H. Holmes of the Boston Herald. Later, G.A. Whitehead of the U.S. Forest Service renamed it Mount Deception due to the difficulty mountaineers had in locating climbing routes on the often cloud-covered peak.

Recreation

Unlike the peaks of Gray Wolf Ridge, which are scalable for fit and determined day hikers, mountaineering skills are necessary for Mount Deception itself. While not a particularly technical climb, it is steep and exposed. If a climber falls and does not arrest immediately, loose rock and rotten snow may make it difficult to stop falling for some distance. Fatalities have occurred on Mount Deception and the National Park Service recommends climbers be experienced in self-arrest skills, rock climbing, and route-finding.

The adjacent Needles are typically regarded as providing better, and somewhat more difficult, mountaineering objectives in the Royal Basin area.

Climate

Based on the Köppen climate classification, Mount Deception is located in the marine west coast climate zone of western North America. Most weather fronts originate in the Pacific Ocean, and travel northeast toward the Olympic Mountains. As fronts approach, they are forced upward by the peaks of the Olympic Range, causing them to drop their moisture in the form of rain or snowfall (Orographic lift). As a result, the Olympics experience high precipitation, especially during the winter months. During winter months, weather is usually cloudy, but, due to high pressure systems over the Pacific Ocean that intensify during summer months, there is often little or no cloud cover during the summer. In terms of favorable weather, the best months for climbing are June through September.

Geology

The Olympic Mountains are composed of obducted clastic wedge material and oceanic crust, primarily Eocene sandstone, turbidite, and basaltic oceanic crust. The mountains were sculpted during the Pleistocene era by erosion caused by glaciers advancing and retreating multiple times.

See also

 Olympic Mountains
 Geology of the Pacific Northwest
 Geography of Washington (state)
 List of mountains of the United States
 List of mountains by elevation

References

External links
 
 
 Mount Deception weather: Mountain Forecast
 Mt. Deception photo: Flickr

Mountains of Washington (state)
Olympic Mountains
Mountains of Jefferson County, Washington
Landforms of Olympic National Park